Union Sportive Rumelange, usually abbreviated to US Rumelange, is a football club, based in Rumelange, in south-western Luxembourg.

History 
In the 2005–2006 season, Rumelange finished eleventh in the National Division. It was almost impossible for Rumelange to avoid fourth place, and they were pitted against FC Mamer in a relegation play-off. Rumelange lost on penalties, and were relegated to the Division of Honour. They won promotion to the highest level again at the end of the 2007–2008 season.

Honours

League
National Division
Runners-up: 1967–68, 1969–70, 1971–72

Cups
Luxembourg Cup
Winners: 1967–68, 1974–75
Runners-up: 1981–82, 1983–84

European competition 

US Rumelange have qualified for UEFA European competition four times. However, they have been generally unsuccessful; during their 1972–73 UEFA Cup campaign, they suffered a 21–0 aggregate loss to Feyenoord, a record defeat that has not been eclipsed in any UEFA cup competition. It has not been matched either, except for when, one year earlier, Chelsea had beaten Jeunesse Hautcharage by the same aggregate scoreline.

UEFA Cup Winners' Cup
First round (2): 1968–69, 1975–76

UEFA Cup
First round (2): 1970–71, 1972–73

Current squad

Staff 

Head Coach: Marc Thomé
Assistant Coach: Manuel Cardoni

Managers 
 Marc Thomé (July 1, 2007 – April 26, 2010)
 Manuel Cardoni (April 27, 2010 – Oct 1, 2012)
 Sebastien Allieri (July 1, 2013 – 23 May 2015)
 Sven Loscheider (29 May 2017 – present)

References

External links 
 

Rumelange
Rumelange
Rumelange
1908 establishments in Luxembourg